Constant Image is the debut studio album by American indie rock band Flasher. It was released on June 8, 2018 under Domino Recording Company.

Release
On March 8, 2018, the band released their first single and music video "Skim Milk". The band explained the song: "The themes in "Skim Milk" and its video might be described as being haunted by your own desire for belonging. We're not bemoaning "no future, no fate," we're advocating for it. From getting a mortgage, to going to college, to crafting public policy, folks are always telling you to think of your future, to make choices in the name of some future. But most folks don't have the privilege to live outside the present."

On April 19, 2018, Flasher announced the release of their debut album, along with the second single "Pressure".

The third single "Who's Got Time?" was released on May 24, 2018.

Critical reception
Constant Image was met with "generally favorable" reviews from critics. At Metacritic, which assigns a weighted average rating out of 100 to reviews from mainstream publications, this release received an average score of 79, based on 9 reviews. Aggregator Album of the Year gave the release an 82 out of 100 based on a critical consensus of 8 reviews.

Bekki Bemrose from AllMusic said: "Their debut is stacked with hooks and radio-friendly tunes, but their melodic sense is matched by an abstract yet incisive lyricism. Flasher appear to have arrived fully formed, with a deeply satisfying debut that's both coherent and imaginative." Savoula Stylinaou from Exclaim! said: "On Constant Image, Flasher speaks to the realities of gentrification, self-discovery and escapism. The band masterfully produce politically charged tracks situated in tales of the everyday struggle of people living in America's political seat."

Accolades

Track listing

Personnel
Credits adapted from AllMusic

Musicians
 Emma Baker – vocals, drums
 Taylor Mulitz – guitar
 Daniel Saperstein – bass
 Patrick Cain – saxophone
 Owen Wuerker – piano
 Mark Cisneros – saxophone

Production
 Nicolas Vernhes – producer, engineer
 Don Godwin – mixing
 Kyle Joseph – engineer
 Heba Kadry – mastering

References

2018 debut albums
Domino Recording Company albums